H&E Paramotores S.L., variously referred to as HE Paramotores, Paramotores H.E and H.E Paramotores, is a Spanish aircraft manufacturer based in Madrid. The company specializes in the design and manufacture of paramotors in the form of ready-to-fly aircraft for the US FAR 103 Ultralight Vehicles rules and the European Fédération Aéronautique Internationale microlight category.

The company was founded in 1999 and has a  manufacturing facility equipped with modern CNC machinery.

The company is a Sociedad de Responsabilidad Limitada, a form of Spanish limited liability company.

Products

Paramotors
Initially the company produced paramotor models with imported engines, including the now-discontinued H&E Paramotores Corsario, Solo, Simonini and the Ziklon. Newer paramotors include the H&E Paramotores R90NG, R125NG and the Airmax. The company also offers a trike package to adapt its paramotors for wheeled takeoffs and landings.

Engines
After starting production of paramotors with engines from other manufacturers, such as the Solo 210 engine, Cors'Air, Simonini Racing engines and the Per Il Volo Top 80 the company embarked on the development of its own line of engines. These now include the H&E Paramotores R90, R125 and the Airmax 220cc.

Aircraft

References

External links

Aircraft manufacturers of Spain
Manufacturing companies based in Madrid
Ultralight aircraft
Powered parachutes
Paramotors